Misamis Occidental's 1st congressional district is one of the two congressional districts of the Philippines in the province of Misamis Occidental. It has been represented in the House of Representatives since 1987. The district encompasses the northern half of the province consisting of its capital, Oroquieta, and the municipalities of Aloran, Baliangao, Calamba, Concepcion, Jimenez, Lopez Jaena, Panaon, Plaridel and Sapang Dalaga. It is currently represented in the 19th Congress by Jason P. Almonte of the PDP–Laban.

Representation history

Election results

2022

2019

2016

2013

2010

See also
Legislative districts of Misamis Occidental

References

Congressional districts of the Philippines
Politics of Misamis Occidental
1987 establishments in the Philippines
Congressional districts of Northern Mindanao
Constituencies established in 1987